Scrobipalpa halimioniella is a moth in the family Gelechiidae. It was described by Peter Huemer and Ole Karsholt in 2010. It is found southern France and has also been recorded from Ukraine.

The larvae feed on Halimione portulacoides. They live between spun leaves, mining them from the inside.

Etymology
The species name refers to the larval host plant Halimione.

References

Scrobipalpa
Moths described in 2010